Aquaculture in the United Kingdom is dominated by salmon farming (mostly in Scotland), then by mussel production with trout being the third most important enterprise.

UK aquaculture applies to three main strands of species; finfish (salmon, trout, carp etc.), shellfish (mussels, oyster, lobster etc.) and marine algae (seaweed). These are rated in the tonnage that is produced annually. Aquaponics involves the symbiotic relationship of fish farming with growing plants in water (a process whereby the plants clean the dirty water from the fish tank). As such, aquaponics is not included in this article. A fourth strand is ornamental (coldwater fish, tropical fish and aquatic plants), but this is in very small volumes by weight.

Scottish finfish aquaculture is rated third in the world behind Norway and Chile in terms of tonnage of production, and is the United Kingdom's most valuable food export. Aquaculture is also increasingly being used to help conserve rare species where breeding grounds have been destroyed or other environmental factors have affected reproductive patterns.

Overview
Historically in the United Kingdom, as in other European nations, the keeping of fish in ponds for use as food dates back centuries, possibly as far as the 13th century. A fish pond was a way of keeping a steady supply of food through the winter, and most Medieval and monastic houses and castles had a fish pond stocked with carp, pike and bream. Some were vastly under-utilised and the efforts of keeping fish was to serve up only on special occasions, especially in monastic houses, when freshwater fish would be avoided at Lent. During the 19th century, as fresh sea fish could be brought from ports to inland locations by the railways, the stocking, breeding and farming of fresh fish declined, unlike eastern European nations where the carp is still a 'table fish'.

The aquaculture industry in the United Kingdom is dominated by the farming of Atlantic salmon (mariculture), which is concentrated in the shoreline waters around Scotland. Smaller aquaculture business include seaweed farming in Yorkshire and Cornwall and a shellfish industry in Wales. Salmon farming in Scotland started production in the early 1970s and the number of companies increased exponentially. Even though the number of farming sites have been increasing, the number of different companies has decreased; in 1995 62 companies operated 162 sites between them, by 2016, 254 sites were in operation overseen by just 16 companies. By 2019, only 12 businesses were in operation at what was described as "226 active sites". However, concerns with the detrimental effects of fish farming on the fish themselves, the wild fish and the immediate environment that they habit and cohabit, has led to some criticism from wildlife groups and academics.

99% of finfish production is from Scotland, whilst 47% of shellfish production comes from England and Wales. The Centre for Environment, Fisheries and Aquaculture Science (CEFAS), has over 500 business registered in England and Wales for finfish aquaculture, though most of these are breeders of fish for ponds and indoor tanks. Producers can apply to become members of the BAP (Best Aquaculture Practice), which guarantees responsibility and certification for every step in the production chain.

The second largest aquaculture market in terms of tonnage is the shellfish market, mostly mussels, but also oysters and scallops. The abalone Haliotis tuberculata, known as green ormer in the UK, is increasing possible to be farmed in the coastal waters of the southern half of the United Kingdom due to global warming, and some trials have taken place on the south west coast. The ormer does not suffer the effects of pollutants, and more importantly, does not store toxins in its flesh unlike other bivalve creatures.

Salmon

Scotland
Salmon farming on a commercial scale was started in Britain by a company called Marine Harvest, then a subsidiary company of Unilever. Marine Harvest had invested in two sites in the 1960s, a salmon and trout farm in Lochailort, and a flatfish and crustacean research centre in Findon, just outside Aberdeen. The first fish production from Lochailort was achieved in 1971, since then the industry has expanded and salmon and trout are farmed commercially in Scotland at sites in Argyll & Bute, Highland, Orkney, Shetland and the Western Isles.

In 2014, fish farming in Scotland led to a turnover in the country to the tune of £1 billion, and supported over 8,800 jobs. However, diseases, and parasites such as the sea louse, have had a detrimental effect on the industry and have led to many different ideas on how to combat the parasite. Mortality rates of salmon during the 1990s and 2000s was rated at about 20% of eventual production tonnage. The indications are that this percentage is increasing. Companies have been moving away from using chemical and water washes to rid the salmon of lice, with a more 'natural' method being the use of wrasse and lumpsucker fish which clean the fish of the parasites.

Additionally, the increase in production has led to waste produced by the salmon settling on the sea-bed of the Scottish sea lochs. Companies have been trying large storm-proof cages that can be deployed further out to sea, thus the current will spread the waste over a larger area. Another benefit of the cages is that the stronger currents will make the salmon swim harder and increase their muscle tone, which makes them comparable to wild salmon. The Scottish Environment Protection Agency has indicated that providing the newer farms further out to sea meet the standards required "on chemical, faecal and organic waste pollution in surrounding seas", it would not place a restriction on these newer farms.

Salmon farming has also led to criticism from wildlife groups, conservationist and anglers, all of whom point to lower levels of wild salmon swimming up river to spawn. They allege that the mass proliferation of sea farming methods has had a detrimental effect on the wild salmon species. One journalist pointed out that a  cage could hold up to 70,000 fish, which he said was the equivalent of "..a series of floating battery hen sheds; salmon has long been sold on the prospect of cleanliness and health. The impression is fraudulent."

A Parliamentary committee raised the possibility of salmon farms being located on land to avoid the prevalence of sea lice. One speaker at the committee's hearing stated that they were spending £50 million to produce  of fish, and that the added cost of building concrete structures to house the fish would cost extra and would be power hungry, therefore negating the  benefits of having open pens/cages in the sea.

Due to the large number of salmon migratory rivers on the east coast of Scotland, no salmon farms have been allowed to be sited in that area.

Northern Ireland
In 2007, the only salmon farm on the coast of Northern Ireland lost all its stock of 100,000 fish when a swarm of "billions" of jellyfish (mauve stingers pelagia noctiluca) got into the nets and killed them all. A similar event occurred in 2014 at a fish farm in Loch Duart on North Uist. The jellyfish is small enough to get into the pens holding the salmon, but its usual habitat is further south in the Mediterranean. Scientist have stated that is appearance in UK waters is a sign of global warming. The company restructured in 2008 and was able to achieve production in 2009 under a different name. It advertises itself as being an organic farm and is spread across two sites at Glenarm and Red Bay in County Antrim.

Like their Scottish neighbours, the location of farmed fish has been cited as the reason for the drop of wild salmon migrating upriver to spawn. A monitoring station on the River Bush has found that numbers of migrating fish have dropped by a third in some years.

England and Wales
Minimal salmon farming is undertaken in Wales. However, the tonnage and relative price of the salmon market makes salmon the most valuable food item in the United Kingdom that is exported and which supports a network of jobs in rural areas. Most salmon farming in England is at designated hatcheries which then release the juvenile fish (smolts) into designated salmon rivers.

Mussels
The production of mussels in the coastal water around the United Kingdom is likely to be affected by climate change. A Government report in 2018 estimated that a  temperature rise in seawater could lead to a reduction of 50% in mussel aquaculture. One variant of mussel aquaculture is less labour-intensive than other aquaculture strands as growers simply install lines in the sea and wild mussels attach themselves to the lines feeding off naturally occurring plankton. All the grower has to do is harvest the mussels at the right point in their growing cycle. However, in North Wales, the farmers are constantly moving their mussels along the sea-bed to deeper and deeper water to promote growth. 

The global mussel market is worth over £1.5 billion annually (2018) and represents the largest tonnage in Europe, but the second largest after salmon aquaculture in the UK.

England
Mussels are farmed offshore in Cornwall and Devon. Another mussel farm, in Cornwall is located in St Austell Bay and also supports one of the Seaweed farmers and is a release point for lobsters from the Padstow Lobster Hatchery.

Scotland
In 2018, the Scottish industry produced  of mussels with a value of £7.8 million. The bulk of mussel production comes from Shetland, and the Western Isles. No shellfish are farmed on the eastern coast of Scotland.

Mussel farming is a large industry in Scotland, one company has 14 sites and provides over 70% of the mussel crop from Scotland every year.

Wales
Mussels are farmed in North wales around the Menai Strait and Conwy. Small mussel farming also takes place on the coast of South Wales. Around the Menai Strait, the mussel farmers use boats to capture young mussels and they site them in the intertidal zone which dries out at low tide. This prompts hard shell growth, and as they get bigger, they are moved further offshore until they are submerged all the time which prompts body mass build-up. The vast majority of mussels exported from the United Kingdom are from the mussel farms in North wales.

A proposal to create a tidal lagoon in Swansea Bay to create electricity would have provided a perfect site to farm mussels. Although the project was shelved by the UK Government, in early 2019, the company behind the idea was still hoping it would come to fruition with other investment. A report commissioned by a local oyster company detailed the possibility of farming mussel, native oyster, pacific oyster, the European clam and macroalgae (seaweed).

Other shellfish

Oysters are also reared in Loch Fyne, Argyll and Bute by the Loch Fyne Oysters company. Another company, Scot-Hatch, grow scallops in the waters of Loch Ewe, but they are all sent to Norway for spawning. The company produced 750,000 scallops in 2012. Oyster harvesting has been a traditional shellfish industry in the town of Whitstable, Kent, for centuries, but after diseases and overfishing affected the oysters, the company started to farm Pacific rock oysters. Oysters are also farmed in Poole Harbour and the River Blackwater near Maldon in Essex. Most oysters that are farmed are pacific oysters rather than the native Atlantic oyster. An increase in sewage, loss of habitat, overfishing and some very cold winters led to a decline in the native Atlantic oyster industry. The British Shellfish Association estimates that there are over 20 oyster beds in estuaries around the United Kingdom, most do not farm, but just harvest.

A rapid decline in the oyster farming industry around The Solent on the south coast of England, led to a ban on oyster fishing in that area. In 2017, a new programme was started whereby millions of oysters will be 'seeded' between the south coast and the Isle of Wight in an attempt to kick-start the industry. The project is expected to reach fruition in 2022.

Trout

Whilst some trout is reared in sea cages like salmon on the Scottish coast, the bulk of trout aquaculture in the United Kingdom is in freshwater ponds, situated on land. There are scarce locations available in England, Northern Ireland and Wales that are suitable for rearing trout at sea, unlike in Scotland. However, rainbow trout reared in Northern Ireland have been exported to Scotland to bolster numbers at onshore farms. Their life-cycle stage has been described as "part-grown". There are up to 350 registered sites across the United Kingdom dedicated to raising rainbow and brown trout, although these are all registered as private companies in Britain as opposed to the larger international companies that are involved in salmon farming.

Seaweed
Seaweed harvesting has been going on in Britain for many centuries and had many uses; food, iodine, glass production, animal feed and fertiliser. Strangford Lough in Northern Ireland has a distinct history of this and still has several kelp-ovens that were used to cook the seaweed.

Small licences have been granted to companies and individuals in Cornwall in England, Pembrokeshire in Wales and several concerns in Scotland. However, all of these are harvesters of naturally grown seaweed, a process that involves cutting the plant but leaving the rootzone behind to allow the seaweed to regenerate. Seaweed farming, IE actually planting and harvesting the crop, is still a relatively new industry in comparison to some countries in Asia who have been seaweed farming for centuries. Most of the companies and universities trying seaweed farming are doing so for non-food related industries, such as research into bio-fuels.

There are between 15 and 20 companies who harvest seaweed in the United Kingdom, but most only collect from wild stocks on the shoreline, and as such, are not partaking in the aquaculture industry proper. The list below only details those who are seeding specialist areas to grow seaweed before harvesting.

Others
In the 1970s, the North American signal crayfish was introduced into some farms in England to rear as food. The species escaped and caused damage to British Rivers by destabilising the riverbanks (it burrows to lay eggs, which caused them to collapse and add sediment to rivers) and, because it carries Crayfish plague, it also almost wiped out the native white clawed crayfish, the only indigenous species in Great Britain, which have no resistance to the disease. By 1992, legislation against introducing the species into Britain had been passed, though no farms were thought to be raising the signal crayfish anyway, as it was deemed to be unprofitable as a food.

Other fish are farmed commercially in the United Kingdom; small amounts of sea trout, common carp, halibut and Nile tilapia. Fish are also bred commercially for fish feed and also for the ornamental pond/tank market. Halibut is farmed at an onshore farm using recirculation tanks on the Isle of Gigha in Scotland.

Sea bass used to be farmed at an on-land recirculation farm, in Anglesey, North Wales. The site went out of business in 2015 when a glut of sea bass from Greece and Turkey flooded the market. In 2017, the site was re-purposed to breed wrasse for use in salmon farms in Scotland, where they would be employed in removing sea lice from the fish.

A short lived venture in Shetland between 2004 and 2008 produced organically reared cod. The venture failed when the company went into administration blaming several issues including organic certification and resale value of the fish, which was deemed excessive in view of wild caught cod.

Conservation
Some programmes are in place to preserve or maintain species which are challenged in their natural environment by raising them in a protected environment. One such example in the United Kingdom is the freshwater pearl mussel (Margaritifera margaritifera) which can live for over 100 years, but have seen a loss of their habitat through changes in water quality and being fished for their pearls. The species was given protected status in the Wildlife and Countryside Act 1981, and hunting, selling or buying the pearls has been illegal since 1998, hasn't stopped illegal activity in removing them from rivers. Another problem in the breeding cycle of the freshwater pearl mussel is that when the young are released by the female, they attach to the gills of passing salmon and trout (without causing any harm to the host fish) and as these fish are now rarer in some rivers, this too has had an effect on the survival of the species.

The mussel is found in several rivers in Scotland, Wales and in Northern Ireland, but was believed to have existed in only two river systems in England (Cumbria and Northumberland). However, small colonies of mussels were found elsewhere in the River Lune in Lancashire and in the River Clun in Shropshire. This was later expanded in 2017 to include 11 watercourses in England with populations numbering as few as 50 (Swindale Beck) to as many as 20,000 (River Rede and River North Tyne). Mussels from the Lune were taken to a fish farm in Cumbria and were left to breed in a tank that fed the water to a downstream tank with fish in. This managed to raise over 4,000 baby mussels which were kept for five years before being released into the River Lune in 2012.

Dedicated hatcheries are running breeding programmes to increase the freshwater pearl mussel numbers. Natural Resources Wales have a hatchery at Cynrig near Brecon, and another hatchery is near to the Kielder Beck in Northumberland. The Cynrig Hatchery also have a breeding programme for the white clawed crayfish (Austropotamobius pallipes) which has suffered a severe decline in Britain (and across Europe) as a result of insecticides and having no natural resistance to a crayfish plague introduced by alien species. Since the crayfish programme was started in 2009, the hatchery has successfully bred and released over 5,000 crayfish into British rivers. In the wild, the crayfish have a 10% chance of survival, the ones released from the hatchery are estimated to have an 80% survival rate, with evidence of first generation crayfish breeding the second generation completely naturally.

Production values
The table below gives production values in imperial tonnes for UK aquaculture. Whilst this does take into account finfish, shellfish and seaweeds, the largest weight is the finfish industry, especially farmed salmon from Scotland.

Research, monitoring and hatcheries
Outwith the tonnages of fish and shellfish reared through aquaculture described above, several other sites produce, monitor or research aquatic organisms. A selection of these are:

Amble Lobster Hatchery - allows lobsters to get to a juvenile stage and then releases them into the local seas
ARCH UK (Aquaculture Research Collaborative Hub for the UK) - a collaborative research project led by the University of Exeter and CEFAS
Ballinderry Fish Hatchery in County Tyrone - was used to breed freshwater pearl mussel young
Bushmills Salmon Station
CEFAS (Centre for Environment, Fisheries and Aquaculture Science) - UK Government run centre based in Lowestoft
Freshwater Biological Association, based in Windermere - have successfully grown baby pearl mussel to seed rivers in the United Kingdom
Kielder Salmon Centre, Kielder - the largest salmon hatchery in England. Has also successfully bred freshwater pearl mussel for re-stocking the River North Tyne
National Lobster Hatchery, Padstow - released over 100,000 juvenile lobsters between 2000 and 2014
Orkney lobster hatchery - release about 60,000 juvenile lobsters into the wild annually

See also
Friend of the Sea
Seaweed farming
North Atlantic Salmon Conservation Organization

Notes

References

Sources

External links
Aquaculture map of Scotland
Video about the Kielder freshwater pearl mussel hatchery

United Kingdom
Agriculture in the United Kingdom
Fishing in the United Kingdom
Articles containing video clips